Hussein Hashim  (born 1 July 1933) is a former Iraqi football midfielder who played for Iraq at the 1964 Arab Nations Cup and 1966 Arab Nations Cup.

Hashim played for Iraq between 1962 and 1966.

References

Iraqi footballers
Iraq international footballers
Living people
Al-Mina'a SC players
Association football midfielders
1933 births
Basra
People from Basra
Sportspeople from Basra